Red Love  (German: Rote Liebe) is a 1982 German film directed by Rosa von Praunheim. 

The film premiered at the Berlin International Film Festival in 1982 and was shown, for example, at the Museum of Modern Art in New York City in 1983.

Plot
This film, based on a novella by Alexandra Kollontai, is about the Soviet women's rights activist and revolutionary Vasilissa, who wants to emancipate herself from her domineering lover Vladimir, the director of the trade cooperative. As a last resort, she has only the murder of the bitter patriarch.

Reception
The renowned German critic Hellmuth Karasek wrote in the magazine Der Spiegel: "Rosa von Praunheim, who since his early hits  The Bed Sausage  and  Berlin Bed Sausage has known how to put us out of our minds about the neat distinction between kitsch and art, between emotion and sentimentality, has also staged a pleasurably disturbing conundrum with Red Love."

Notes

References 
Murray, Raymond. Images in the Dark: An Encyclopedia of Gay and Lesbian Film and Video Guide. TLA Publications, 1994,

External links

1982 films
Films directed by Rosa von Praunheim
West German films
Films based on Russian novels
1980s German-language films
1980s German films